Trevor Jones (born October 1, 1997) is a Canadian rower from Lakefield, Ontario. Jones is a two time World U23 champion in the single sculls event.

Career
Jones won the single sculls at the 2017 and 2018 World Rowing U23 Championships. He missed competing at the 2019 version due to injury. At the 2019 World Rowing Championships, Jones finished in 14th place with Matt Buie in the double sculls, after training with his partner for only a month. After the Worlds, Rowing Canada re-evaluated the crews racing and decided to move Jones back to the single sculls boat.

In May 2021, Jones qualified the singles sculls boat for Canada's 2020 Olympic team, by finishing second at the 2021 FISA Final Qualification Regatta in Lucerne, Switzerland.

References

1997 births
Canadian male rowers
Living people
Rowers at the 2020 Summer Olympics
Olympic rowers of Canada
21st-century Canadian people